is a Japanese television drama series based on the South Korean TV series of the same name.

References

External links
 

Japanese drama television series
2007 Japanese television series debuts
TV Asahi television dramas
Japanese television series based on South Korean television series
Television series set in hotels
2007 Japanese television series endings